Danielsville is a city in Madison County, Georgia, United States. The population was 654 at the 2020 census, up from 560 in 2010. The city is the county seat of Madison County.

History
Danielsville was named for General Allen Daniel (1772-1836), major-general of the Fourth Division of Georgia Militia 1812-17 and both state senator and representative from Elbert and Madison counties. He was Speaker of the Georgia House of Representatives in 1822. His father was at one time thought to be a Captain Allen Daniel of Virginia, a veteran of the Revolutionary War, but this has been disproved. In 1812, Danielsville was designated seat of the newly formed Madison County. Danielsville was incorporated as a town in 1817 and as a city in 1908.

Lynching of Lent Shaw 
On April 11, 1936, a 45-year-old Black father of eleven children, called Lent Shaw in newspaper accounts as his name is misspelled in court documents, was arrested by Madison County police and taken to the county jail in Danielsville. His accuser, a white woman aged 22, alleged that Shaw was the man who had attacked her on April 10. Shaw claimed that he was at home at the time of the alleged attack.

By late evening, word had spread of Shaw's arrest, and a mob of about 150 white county residents gathered at the jail, demanding Shaw be released to them. Sheriff T. L. Henley tried to break up the mob unsuccessfully. The mob began prying apart the brick wall of the jail when 74-year-old judge Berry Mosely, who had been confined to bed with an illness, arrived and began talking down the mob. In the meantime, the county sheriff began rounding up deputies and called in nearby National Guard soldiers. Judge Mosely ordered the sheriff to take Shaw to Grady Memorial Hospital in Atlanta. When the National Guard soldiers arrived, they backed a truck up to the jail and sped away to Athens before the mob could react. No one was severely injured in the incident, but the damaged jail had to be repaired. During transit, Shaw allegedly assaulted police officers escorting him, and the police responded by shooting him three times.

Two weeks later, Shaw was brought back to Danielsville to face trial. The mob reappeared, and Mosely again ordered Shaw moved away for his safety, this time to Royston. That location was not far enough to protect him from the mob, which followed Shaw to the jail there. In April 1936, in the middle of the night, the mob stormed the jail, shot Shaw multiple times, and lynched him, leaving his hanging body to be found later. His lynchers posed for pictures memorializing the barbaric event. His death was the 468th lynching in Georgia since 1889.

Images of the lynching, featuring Shaw's battered corpse flanked by his attackers, were printed extensively by the national press including the Atlanta Daily World, The Crisis, The New York Times, and other newspapers. Shaw's lynching is referenced in archival material from the NAACP archives at the Library of Congress, and the story has been preserved and explored by historians of racial violence including Dr. Nell Irvin Painter and Dr. Amy Louise Wood. Photographs of the lynching are also featured in author Richard Wright's landmark book, 12 Million Black Voices. To date, none of Shaw's murderers have been publicly identified or brought to justice, though many of their faces are clearly displayed in photos of the lynching.

Geography
Danielsville is located in central Madison County at  (34.124244, -83.216496). Georgia State Route 98 passes through the northeastern part of Danielsville, leading northwest  to Ila and southeast  to Comer.

The city is drained to the south by tributaries of the South Fork of the Broad River, part of the Savannah River watershed.

Climate

Demographics

As of the census of 2000, there were 457 people, 193 households, and 119 families residing in the city. The racial makeup of the city was 95.40% White, 2.19% Black or African American, 0.44% Native American, 1.09% from other races, and 0.88% from two or more races. 3.50% of the population were Hispanic or Latino of any race.

There were 193 households, out of which 29.5% had children under the age of 18 living with them, 49.2% were married couples living together, 9.8% had a female householder with no husband present, and 38.3% were non-families. 34.7% of all households were made up of individuals, and 18.1% had someone living alone who was 65 years of age or older. The average household size was 2.25 and the average family size was 2.92.

In the city, the population was spread out, with 22.8% under the age of 18, 9.6% from 18 to 24, 34.1% from 25 to 44, 18.8% from 45 to 64, and 14.7% who were 65 years of age or older. The median age was 34 years. For every 100 females, there were 92.0 males. For every 100 females age 18 and over, there were 91.8 males.

The median income for a household in the city was $37,639, and the median income for a family was $43,542. Males had a median income of $30,469 versus $22,188 for females. The per capita income for the city was $14,086. About 8.8% of families and 12.4% of the population were below the poverty line, including 13.7% of those under age 18 and 11.8% of those age 65 or over.

Education

Madison County School District 
The Madison County School District holds pre-school to grade twelve, and consists of five elementary schools, a middle school, and a high school. The district has 290 full-time teachers and over 4,621 students.
Colbert Elementary School
Comer Elementary School
Danielsville Elementary School
Hull-Sanford Elementary School
Ila Elementary School
Madison County Middle School
Madison County High School
Broad River College and Career Academy.

Notable people
Crawford W. Long, the man who first used ether in surgery, born in Danielsville
Jake Westbrook, American Major League baseball player

References

External links

Cities in Madison County, Georgia
County seats in Georgia (U.S. state)
Athens – Clarke County metropolitan area